Brassicibacter thermophilus is a Gram-negative, thermophilic, obligately anaerobic, non-spore-forming and non-motile bacterium from the genus of Brassicibacter.

References

Bacillota
Bacteria described in 2015